Shanghai Xingzhi High School is a senior high school in Shanghai, China.
Located in the Baoshan district in the north eastern part of Shanghai, it was named after Tao Xingzhi, a prominent educator.

External links
 Official website

High schools in Shanghai